Dione Meier (born 3 September 1981) is a Canadian softball player. She competed in the women's tournament at the 2008 Summer Olympics. She spent two years at Galveston College, winning NJCAA All-American honors, before transferring to Nicholls State, where she was named Southland Conference pitcher of the year during her senior season in 2004.

References

1981 births
Living people
Canadian softball players
Olympic softball players of Canada
Softball players at the 2008 Summer Olympics
Sportspeople from Calgary
Galveston College alumni
Nicholls Colonels softball players